Wang Zhuocheng (born 19 September 1996), is a Chinese actor.

Career 
Wang graduated from the Central Academy of Drama, majoring in musical. Thereafter, he was signed onto the agency Huayi Brothers.

In 2019, Wang gained recognition after starring in the xianxia drama The Untamed, receiving praise for his role as Jiang Cheng.

Filmography

Television series

Discography

Awards and nominations

References 

1996 births
Living people
Chinese male television actors
21st-century Chinese male actors